Harvey Richard Hosein (born 12 August 1996) is an English former professional cricketer who played for Derbyshire County Cricket Club. He is a right-handed batsman who also played as a wicket-keeper.

Hosein equalled the world record for the most catches taken on debut with seven in a County Championship innings against Surrey in September 2014. In the same match he set a new Derbyshire record for the most catches in the first-class match with eleven.

In October 2021, Hosein retired from cricket following a series of concussions.

References

External links
 

1996 births
Living people
English cricketers
Derbyshire cricketers
Cricketers from Chesterfield, Derbyshire
People educated at Denstone College
Wicket-keepers